The Orange Grove Plantation House is a historic house on a former plantation in Terrebonne Parish, about eight miles away from Houma, Louisiana. It was built in 1850 for John C. Beatty, a sugar planter who owned slaves. The plantation spanned 2,470 acres of land when it was sold at auction shortly after Beatty's death in 1857. Beatty's slaves were sold with the property.

The house was designed in the Greek Revival architectural style. It has been listed on the National Register of Historic Places since March 26, 1980.

References

	
National Register of Historic Places in Terrebonne Parish, Louisiana
Greek Revival architecture in Louisiana
Houses completed in 1850
Plantation houses in Louisiana
1850 establishments in Louisiana